The 2020 Quaker State 400 presented by Walmart was a NASCAR Cup Series race held on July 12, 2020 at Kentucky Speedway in Sparta, Kentucky. Contested over 267 laps on the  speedway, it was the 17th race of the 2020 NASCAR Cup Series season. Cole Custer became the 1st rookie in series history to claim his 1st career win at the track as well as the 33rd different driver to have won a race in all three NASCAR national touring series.

Report

Background

The tenth running of the Quaker State 400 was held in Sparta, Kentucky at Kentucky Speedway on July 9, 2016. The track is a  tri-oval speedway owned by Speedway Motorsports, Inc. Kentucky Speedway, which has also hosted the ARCA Menards Series, NASCAR Gander RV & Outdoors Truck Series, NASCAR Xfinity Series, and the Indy Racing League, has a grandstand seating capacity of 107,000.

Entry list
 (R) denotes rookie driver.
 (i) denotes driver who are ineligible for series driver points.

Qualifying
Kyle Busch was awarded the pole for the race as determined by a random draw.

Starting Lineup

Race

Stage Results

Stage One
Laps: 80

Stage Two
Laps: 80

Final Lap

With 7 laps to go, Kevin Harvick was leading the race but a caution came out when Matt Kenseth spun in turn 4. As a result, the field would be bunched up and the race would go into overtime. Harvick was the leader and chose the outside for the restart with Martin Truex Jr. in 2nd, Ryan Blaney in 3rd, Brad Keselowski in 4th, Kurt Busch in 5th, and Cole Custer in 6th. On the restart, Custer made a move on the outside of Keselowski and took the 4th spot from Keselowski. Off of 2, Kevin Harvick took the lead from Martin Truex Jr. but Truex came up into Harvick causing Harvick to get loose. In turn 3, Truex made a move to the outside to take the lead from Harvick but the two left the inside open and Ryan Blaney went to the inside to make it 3 wide heading to the white flag. As the white flag flew, Custer made a move to the outside and made  it 4 wide for the lead. Custer took the lead in turn 1 and never gave it up scoring his first Cup Series victory in his 20th Cup Series start and becoming the first rookie to score a win at Kentucky.

Final Stage Results

Stage Three
Laps: 107

Race statistics
 Lead changes: 13 among 9 different drivers
 Cautions/Laps: 8 for 42
 Red flags: 0
 Time of race: 2 hours, 59 minutes and 49 seconds
 Average speed:

Media

Television
Fox Sports televised the race in the United States on FS1. Mike Joy and Jeff Gordon covered the race from the Fox Sports studio in Charlotte. Jamie Little handled the pit road duties. Larry McReynolds provided insight from the Fox Sports studio in Charlotte.

Radio
PRN had the radio call for the race, which was simulcast on Sirius XM NASCAR Radio. Doug Rice and Mark Garrow called the action from the booth when the field raced down the front straightaway. Doug Turnbull called the action from turns 1 & 2 and Pat Patterson called the action from turns 3 & 4. Brad Gillie, Brett McMillan and Wendy Venturini called the duties on pit lane.

Standings after the race

Drivers' Championship standings

Manufacturers' Championship standings

Note: Only the first 16 positions are included for the driver standings.
. – Driver has clinched a position in the NASCAR Cup Series playoffs.

References

2020 Quaker State 400
2020 NASCAR Cup Series
2020 in sports in Kentucky
July 2020 sports events in the United States